Mohammad Abdallah Al Gaz (c. 1930–2016), was a financier, developer, diplomat, central banker and philanthropist in the early years of the United Arab Emirates. Al Gaz became a member of Dubai’s first generation of market-making investors and developers in the 1950s through his partnership with Juma al Majid, who was ranked among the 100 richest Arabs in 2016.

Partnership in the gold trade

Emerging as an enterprising trader in textiles and commodities between markets in the Middle East, Al Gaz entered the historic Switzerland-Dubai-India gold trade in the 1950s after recruiting and partnering with his then-grocer and friend, Juma Al Majid. Partnerships such as those between the brothers Saif Ahmad Al Ghurair Sheikh Rashid bin Saeed assumed formal rule in 1958. This was followed by a period of growth and stability, which particularly contrasted to the difficulties Sheikh Rashid's predecessor, Sheikh Saeed bin Maktoum, experienced in the 1930s with the pearl merchants who dominated Dubai's then pearl-based, fishing trade, and caused the Rebellion of 1938.

Diplomacy and Dubai Infrastructure Development

Mohammad Al Gaz became a  diplomatic adviser to Sheikh Rashid. He was used as an initial diplomatic channel between Dubai and Abu Dhabi during a time when protracted zero-sum land negotiations were at the centre of the diplomatic relationship; Al Gaz helped to reconcile the two sides.

The Indian gold trade fell out of vogue with the partnerships in the early 1970s. Al Gaz and his partner Al Majid started to direct their investments into projects that brought know-how or infrastructure to Dubai, which was behind its far more developed rivals in Kuwait and Bahrain. Al Gaz and Al Majid invested heavily in securing franchise rights and developing real estate projects; they secured distribution or exclusive franchise rights to international brands in Dubai, including General Electric, Samsung, Phillips, Opel, Pepsi, Nissan, Hyundai, and Kia.

After 11 years of partnership, they split their assets on a mutually agreed basis; reflecting in later years, Al Majid was noted theirs was the only Dubai trading empire of the age to split amicably, with the Al Futtaim partnership, for example, sustaining bitter empire battles on the ending of a major partnerships.

Unlike Al Majid, Al Gaz divested from the majority of his franchise holdings (e.g. selling franchise rights to Nissan in the 1980s) to concentrate on real estate development. Having buildt the first three-story building in Dubai's history, Al Gaz then developed much of the properly around Port Said: the clock-tower plaza, and Hamriya in Bur Deira, in what became the Deira market place.

Federal roles and philanthropy

Post-federation, Al Gaz helped found the National Council and served as the first Deputy Chairman of the Central Bank of the UAE, from the Bank's founding in 1980 into the mid-1990s. Serving under the Chairman Sheikh Suroor bin Mohammad Al Nahyan, Al Gaz was an important figure in the first two decades of the UAE's economic development.

Being among the first generation of Dubai business people formed after the crises of the 1930s, Al Gaz tried to move away from the pearl business. He encouraged private investment in public education by building schools, including the Amna bint Wahb Girls School, the Gamal Abdulnasser Boys School, and the Community Schools. He endowed public and private institutions anonymously, and in 1989 developed with Juma Al Majid the United Arab Emirates' first charitable society, Beit Al Khair.

In 2012, Sheikh Khalifa bin Zayed Al Nahyan presented Al Gaz with the Spirit of the Union Award for his contributions toward the early development of the UAE.

Death
On April 12, 2016, Mohammed Al Gaz died of cardiovascular failure. Succeeded by eight sons, Al Gaz relinquished the control and management of his holding firm to his eldest son, Abdallah Al Gaz, during his lifetime.

References

External links
http://www.zawya.com/cm/profile.cfm/cid730440//United%20Arab%20Agencies
https://web.archive.org/web/20080913040802/http://www.dsmgdubai.com/dir1.htm
http://beitalkhair.org/en/

1930 births
2016 deaths
People from Dubai
Emirati businesspeople